Kevin Taylor (born June 11, 1974) is an American serial killer and rapist who strangled four prostitutes to death in Chicago between June and August 2001, later discarding their bodies across multiple areas. After a would be fifth victim survived and identified him, Taylor was arrested and sentenced to multiple life terms in 2006.

Early life 
Taylor was born on June 11, 1974. Throughout his childhood, he was placed in numerous foster homes as both of his parents were convicts. Taylor lodged his first arrest in 1993 for burglary, for which he was sent to serve four years in prison. In 1999, he was convicted for the unlawful use of a weapon. In December 2000 he was granted work at a Cheesecake Factory on North Michigan Avenue, where he started working as a cook. By the summer of 2001, Taylor was living with his girlfriend and his two children in Edwardsville.

Murders 
Taylor, an avid frequenter of prostitutes, chose them as his murder victims. He would approach his would-be victims and make arrangements to meet up and have sex. He would then take them to secluded locations and would proceed to get into drug-induced arguments about the cost of sex, which resulted in him strangling them to death.

 Ola Mae Wallace (39): body discovered on June 25, 2001, inside an alleyway along North Sheridan Road.
 Diane Jordan (42): body discovered in an alleyway on July 10, 2001, in the 1400 block on North Mohawk Street.
 Cynthia Hawk (38): body discovered inside a trash can in an alley on July 29, 2001, at 1150 N. LaSalle Street.
 Bernadine Blunt (39): body discovered on August 18, 2001, inside an abandoned building at 331 E. Kensington Ave.

Phyllis Robinson (38), was attacked and strangled on July 27, 2001. She was not sexually assaulted and is the only victim to have survived Taylor.

Investigation and arrest 
In early August, police in Chicago's north side issued an alert to local street women, warning them about the recent murders. By this time, they already had been investigating the deaths of up to 18 women involved with prostitution dating back to the 1990s. When police were examining the body of Blunt, they discovered a timecard underneath her, which contained Taylor's name, and he was arrested at his job on August 24. By this time, the four murders were suspected to be linked, and police sought to question the only surviving victim of the killer, who was Robinson.

In a police line-up, Robinson identified Taylor as the man who attacked her, and he was charged with the other murders. The charges laid against him surprised just about everyone who knew Taylor. Larry Jones, a friend of Taylor's girlfriend, told the Chicago Tribune that "He just didn’t do all the things they say he did. I went to church today to pray for him. I hope he gets through this alright."

After some time however, Taylor confessed to police that he had been responsible for all five crimes because he became enraged at the women during sex. With the help of local authorities, Taylor led them to the murder scenes, and reenacted the methods he used killing his victims.

Trials and imprisonment 
In January 2006, Taylor's trial for one of the murders, that of Cynthia Halk, was opened. During the trial, Taylor never took the stand, and his defense team did not try to convince the jury that he was innocent, as they had already been exposed to Taylor's videotaped confession. The jury found Taylor guilty of killing Halk, subsequently sentencing him to 50-years in prison. His trial for the three other murders was due to begin later that year, but he pleaded guilty to avoid a possible death sentence. On September 6, he was convicted of three more counts of first-degree murder, receiving a sentence of life imprisonment without parole. As of 2023, Taylor is incarcerated at Menard Correctional Center in Chester, Illinois, under the identification number B52807.

See also 
 List of serial killers in the United States

External links 
 Illinois Department of Corrections Information

References 

1974 births
2001 murders in the United States
20th-century American criminals
American male criminals
American people convicted of attempted murder
American people convicted of burglary
American people convicted of murder
American prisoners sentenced to life imprisonment
American rapists
American serial killers
Crime in Chicago
Crimes against sex workers in the United States
Criminals from Chicago
Living people
Male serial killers
People convicted of murder by Illinois
Prisoners sentenced to life imprisonment by Illinois
Violence against women in the United States